Pearl Urima Kaleopa-Palaiali'i (born 7 January 1970) is a former Australian rugby union player. She made her test debut for Australia in 1994 against New Zealand in Sydney. She competed for the Wallaroos at the 1998 and 2002 Rugby World Cup's.

In 2019, Palaiali'i played for the Classic Wallaroos team in a ten-a-side match against a Central North women's side.

References 

1970 births
Living people
Australian female rugby union players
Australia women's international rugby union players